Brit Awards 1996  was the 16th edition of the Brit Awards, an annual pop music awards ceremony in the United Kingdom. It was organised by the British Phonographic Industry and took place on 19 February 1996 at Earls Court Exhibition Centre in London.

Performances

 Alanis Morissette – "Hand in My Pocket"
 David Bowie  – "Hallo Spaceboy" (with Pet Shop Boys), "Moonage Daydream" & "Under Pressure" 
 Michael Jackson – "Earth Song"
 Pulp – "Sorted for E's & Wizz"
 Simply Red – "Fairground"
 Take That – "How Deep Is Your Love"

Winners and nominees

Outstanding Contribution to Music
David Bowie

Freddie Mercury Award
The Help Album

Artist of a Generation
Michael Jackson

Notable moments

Michael Jackson and Jarvis Cocker
Michael Jackson was given a special Artist of a Generation award. At the ceremony he accompanied his single "Earth Song" with a stage show, culminating with Jackson as a 'Christ-like figure' surrounded by children. Pulp frontman Jarvis Cocker mounted the stage in what he would later claim as protest at this portion of the performance. Cocker ran across the stage, lifting his shirt and pointing his (clothed) bottom in Jackson's direction. Cocker was subsequently questioned by the police on suspicion of causing injury towards three of the children in Jackson's performance, who were now on stage. No criminal proceedings followed. It was later alleged that someone in Jackson's entourage hurt the children.

Oasis and Blur
1996 saw the height of a well-documented feud between Britpop rivals Oasis and Blur. The differing styles of the bands, coupled with their prominence within the Britpop movement, led the British media to seize upon the rivalry between the bands. Both factions played along, with the Gallaghers taunting Blur at the ceremony by singing a vulgar rendition of "Parklife" when they collected their "Best British Band" award.

Cut moments

Oasis and Michael Hutchence
INXS frontman Michael Hutchence presented the British video award to Oasis, whose guitarist Noel Gallagher mocked Hutchence upon receiving the award, by sneering, ″Hasbeens shouldn't give awards to gonnabes″, which according to musician and producer Danny Saber upset Hutchence. This inspired Hutchence to add the lyrics ″I'm better than Oasis″ to INXS' single Elegantly Wasted, released the following year. Hutchence committed suicide later that year.

References

External links
Brit Awards 1996 at Brits.co.uk

Brit Awards
BRIT Awards
Brit Awards
Brit Awards
Brit
Brit Awards